A giant dog breed is a breed of dog of gigantic proportions, sometimes described as a breed whose weight exceeds . Breeds sometimes described as giant breeds include the Great Dane, Newfoundland, St. Bernard and Irish Wolfhound. These breeds have seen a marked increase in their size since the 19th century as a result of selective breeding.

Dog breeds described as giants tend to have more health problems than smaller dogs and have the shortest life expectancy of all dog breeds.

See also
Selective breeding

References 

Dog breeds